"If..." is a song by The Bluetones, released as the second single from their second album, Return to the Last Chance Saloon, in 1998. It reached number thirteen on the UK Singles Chart.

In 2006, it was included on the band's two-disc compilation album, A Rough Outline: The Singles & B-Sides 95–03.

Track listing
CD
"If..."
"Blue Shadows"
"The Watchman"

7" / Cassette
"If..."
"Blue Shadows"

Trivia
The title and font are a reference to the 1968 film if.....

The Bluetones songs
1998 singles
Song recordings produced by Hugh Jones (producer)
1998 songs
Songs written by Eds Chesters
Songs written by Adam Devlin
Songs written by Mark Morriss
Songs written by Scott Morriss